Pasha Syafiq Ali (born 19 January 1996) is a Malaysian cricketer who plays for the Malaysia national cricket team. He made his Twenty20 International (T20I) debut for Malaysia against Thailand on 27 June 2019 in the 2019 Malaysia Tri-Nation Series. In July 2019, he was named in Malaysia's squad for the Regional Finals of the 2018–19 ICC T20 World Cup Asia Qualifier tournament.

References

External links
 

1996 births
Living people
Malaysian cricketers
Malaysia Twenty20 International cricketers
Place of birth missing (living people)